The 1925 season was one of tragedy for the Brooklyn Robins. Majority owner and team president Charles Ebbets fell ill after returning home from spring training and died on the morning of April 18. Ed McKeever took over as president, but he caught a cold at Ebbets' funeral and died within a week of pneumonia. Stephen McKeever became the principal owner and team manager Wilbert Robinson was additionally given the position of president. Through it all, the woeful Robins finished in sixth place.

Offseason 
 February 4, 1925: Bernie Neis was traded by the Robins to the Boston Braves for Cotton Tierney.

Regular season

Season standings

Record vs. opponents

Notable transactions 
 May 1, 1925: Art Decatur was traded by the Robins to the Philadelphia Phillies for Bill Hubbell.
 May 10, 1925: Tommy Griffith was traded by the Robins to the Chicago Cubs for Bob Barrett.

Roster

Player stats

Batting

Starters by position 
Note: Pos = Position; G = Games played; AB = At bats; H = Hits; Avg. = Batting average; HR = Home runs; RBI = Runs batted in

Other batters 
Note: G = Games played; AB = At bats; H = Hits; Avg. = Batting average; HR = Home runs; RBI = Runs batted in

Pitching

Starting pitchers 
Note: G = Games pitched; IP = Innings pitched; W = Wins; L = Losses; ERA = Earned run average; SO = Strikeouts

Other pitchers 
Note: G = Games pitched; IP = Innings pitched; W = Wins; L = Losses; ERA = Earned run average; SO = Strikeouts

Relief pitchers 
Note: G = Games pitched; W = Wins; L = Losses; SV = Saves; ERA = Earned run average; SO = Strikeouts

Awards and honors 
TSN Major League All-Star Team
Dazzy Vance

References

External links
Baseball-Reference season page
Baseball Almanac season page
1925 Brooklyn Robins uniform
Brooklyn Dodgers reference site
Acme Dodgers page 
Retrosheet

Los Angeles Dodgers seasons
Brooklyn Robins season
Brooklyn Robins
1920s in Brooklyn
Flatbush, Brooklyn